The 1st National Television Awards ceremony was held at the Wembley Conference Centre on 29 August 1995 and was hosted by Eamonn Holmes.

Awards

References

National Television Awards
National Television Awards
National Television Awards
1995 in London
National Television Awards
National Television Awards